Michael Dahlie (born 1970) is an American novelist. He won a 2010 Whiting Award.

Life
He graduated from Colorado College, and from the University of Wisconsin–Madison with an MA in European history  and from Washington University in St. Louis with an MFA in creative writing.
He was Booth Tarkington Writer-in-Residence, at Butler University.

His first novel, A Gentleman’s Guide to Graceful Living, won the 2009 PEN/Hemingway award. His second book, The Best of Youth, was published in 2013 by WW Norton.
His work has appeared in, Ploughshares, The Kenyon Review, and Tin House.

He lives in Indianapolis.
He is married to the novelist Allison Lynn; they have one son.

Works

Novels

Short stories

References

External links
http://michaeldahlie.com/
Profile at The Whiting Foundation
http://thefanzine.com/articles/columns/276/talk_show_16_with_elizabeth_crane,_michael_dahlie,_tony_d'_souza,_and_salvatore_scibona

1970 births
Living people
21st-century American novelists
Colorado College alumni
University of Wisconsin–Madison College of Letters and Science alumni
Washington University in St. Louis alumni
Writers from New York City
Place of birth missing (living people)
Writers from Indianapolis
Hemingway Foundation/PEN Award winners
American male novelists
Novelists from Indiana
Novelists from New York (state)
21st-century American male writers